Vittorio Filippo Guidano (4 August 1944, Rome, Italy – 31 August 1999, Buenos Aires, Argentina) was an Italian neuropsychiatrist, creator of the cognitive procedural systemic model and contributor to  constructivist post-rationalist cognitive therapy. His cognitive post-rationalist model was influenced by attachment theory, evolutionary epistemology, complex systems theory, and the prevalence of abstract mental processes proposed by Friedrich Hayek. Guidano conceived the personal system as a self-organized entity, in constant development.

Among his published writings are the books Complexity of the Self (1987) and The Self in Progress (1991). He was the first president of the Italian Society of Behavioural and Cognitive Therapy (SITCC) and he co-founded the Institute of Post-Rationalist Psychology and Psychotherapy (IPRA). Guidano's work has been called "the most important influence" on Jeffrey Young's schema therapy. He also influenced the elaboration of other constructivist psychotherapies such as coherence therapy.

Selected publications

Notes

1944 births
1999 deaths
Constructivism (psychological school)
Cognitive psychologists
Italian cognitive scientists
Italian psychiatrists